The Alcobaça Monastery or Alcobasa Monastery (Mosteiro de Santa Maria de Alcobaça) is a Catholic monastic complex located in the town of Alcobaça (or Alcobasa), in central Portugal, some 120 km north of Lisbon. The monastery was established in 1153 by the first Portuguese king, Afonso Henriques, and would develop a close association with the Portuguese monarchy throughout its seven-century-long history.

The church and monastery were the first Gothic buildings in Portugal, and, together with the roughly older Augustinian Monastery of Santa Cruz in Coimbra, it was one of the most important mediaeval monasteries in Portugal. Due to its artistic, cultural and historical relevance, it was included in UNESCO's World Heritage Site list in 1989.

History

The Alcobasa Monastery is one of the first buildings associated with the Cistercian Order in Portugal. It was founded in 1153 as a gift from the first Portuguese king, Afonso I or Afonso Henriques (1112–1185) to Bernard of Clairvaux, following the king's conquest of the city of Santarém from the Moors in March 1147. The foundation of the monastery was part of a larger strategy by King Afonso I to assert his authority and promote the colonisation of lands recently conquered from the Moors during the "Reconquista Cristã" or Reconquista.

Construction began in 1178, some 25 years after the first Cistercian monks settled in the Alcobaça region. Initially, the monks lived in wooden houses, and would only move to the newly built monastery in 1223. The church proper wasn't completed until 1252. Church and adjacent monastery are the earliest examples of truly Gothic architecture in Portugal, and the church itself was the largest in Portugal at the time of its completion. The final touch in this large mediaeval ensemble was given in the late 13th century, when King Denis I (1261–1325) ordered the construction of the Gothic cloister, also known as the Cloister of Silence.

The monks dedicated their lives to religious meditation, creating illuminated manuscripts in a scriptorium. The monks from the monastery produced an early authoritative history on Portugal in a series of books. The library at Alcobasa was one of the largest Portuguese mediaeval libraries, but was pillaged by the invading French in 1810, and many items were stolen in an anti-clerical riot in 1834, when the religious orders in Portugal were dissolved. The remnants of the monastery library, including hundreds of mediaeval manuscripts, are kept today in the Biblioteca Nacional de Portugal , Portugal's national library in Lisbon.

During the Middle Ages, the monastery quickly became a powerful and influential presence within the kingdom of Portugal. The monastery owned and developed extensive agriculture areas, and the abbot exerted influence over a large area. A public school was opened in 1269. The importance of the monastery can be measured by the fact that many monarchs were buried here in the 13th and 14th centuries. Kings Afonso II and Afonso III and their queens Urraca of Castile and Beatrice of Castile are buried here, as well as King Pedro I and his mistress, Inês de Castro, who was murdered on the orders of Pedro's father, King Afonso IV. After being crowned king, Pedro commissioned two magnificent Gothic tombs for himself and his mistress, both of which can still be seen inside the monastery church.

During the reign of Manuel I, a second floor was added to the cloister and a new sacristy was built, following the characteristic Portuguese late Gothic style known as "Manueline". The monastery was further enlarged in the 18th century, with the addition of a new cloister and towers to the church, although the mediaeval structure was mostly preserved. In the Baroque period, the monks were famous for their clay sculptures, many of them are still inside the monastery. Elaborate tiles and altarpieces completed the decoration of the church.

The great 1755 Lisbon earthquake did not cause significant damage to the monastery, although part of the sacristy and some smaller buildings were destroyed. Far greater damage was caused by invading French troops in the first years of the 19th century during the Peninsular War, itself a part of the Napoleonic Wars. In addition to looting the library, they robbed the tombs and stole and burnt part of the inner decoration of the church. In 1834, with the dissolution of the monasteries in Portugal, the last monks left the monastery.

Alcobasa Monastery was classified as a National Monument January 1, 1907 and included to the special protection zone on August 16, 1957.

Art and architecture
The Alcobasa Monastery was built following an early Gothic style, and represents the arrival of this style in Portugal. The church and other main buildings were constructed from 1178 until the end of the 13th century. The church was consecrated in 1252. Following the precepts of the Cistercian Order, the original monastic buildings were built along lean architectonic lines, without any decoration apart from some capital sculpture and a statue of the Virgin Mary.

Exterior
The main façade of the monastery has two plain-style wings with the church in the middle. The façade of the church is a mix of styles: the portal and the rose window above were part of the original church, while the statues and the two flanking towers were added in the beginning of the 18th century. The side walls of the church have crenellations and the apse has eight flying buttresses to support the weight of the vault of the apse, a typical feature of Gothic architecture.

Interior of the church
The first architect(s) of the church, most probably of French origin, followed the design of the Abbey of Clairvaux (now mostly demolished), which had been founded by Bernard of Clairvaux in 1115. The church is a Latin-cross building with pronounced transept arms and three aisles. The lateral aisles of the nave are as high (20 metres) as the central one, which together with the relative slenderness of the church (17 metres) and large length (106 metres) conveys an impression of monumentality. Alcobasa remains, after 800 years, the largest Portuguese church. The vertical emphasis observed in the building is a typical Gothic feature.

Columns and walls are devoid of decoration, as required in Cistercian churches, and the interior is very brightly illuminated by rows of windows on the walls and rose windows on the main façade and transept arms. The main chapel, like that of Clairvaux, is surrounded by a gallery (ambulatory) and has a series of radiating chapels. The aisles are covered by simple Gothic vaulting.

Royal tombs
In the transept of the church are located the tombs of King Pedro I and his mistress, Inês de Castro,  who was assassinated in 1355 on orders of Pedro's father, King Afonso IV. After becoming king, Pedro ordered the remains of his beloved to be transferred to her tomb in Alcobasa and, according to a popular legend, had her crowned as queen of Portugal and ordered court members to pay her homage by kissing her decomposing hand.

This pair of royal tombs in Alcobasa, of unknown authorship, are among the best works of Gothic sculpture in Portugal. The tombs are supported by lions, in the case of the king, and half-men half-beasts, in the case of Ines, and both carry the recumbent figures of the deceased assisted by a group of angels. The sides of Pedro's tomb are magnificently decorated with reliefs showing scenes from Saint Bartholomew's life, as well as scenes from Pedro and Ines' life. Her tomb is decorated with scenes from the life of Christ, including the Crucifixion, and with the Last Judgement.

Chapel of Saint Bernard
This chapel, located in the south side of the transept, has a sculptural group depicting the "Death of Saint Bernard", one of the best works authored by 17th-century Alcobasa monks. In each side of the chapel are buried Kings Afonso II and Afonso III.

Royal Pantheon
From the right arm of the transept one reaches the Royal Pantheon, a room built in the end of the 18th century in Neo-Gothic style, being the earliest Neo-Gothic architecture in Portugal.

The Royal Pantheon has the 13th-century tombs of two queens of Portugal, Urraca of Castile and Beatrix of Castile, married respectively to Kings Afonso II and Afonso III. There are smaller tombs of unidentified princes. The most remarkable tomb is that of Queen Urraca (died in 1220), buried in a richly decorated late Romanesque tomb. A relief showing the queen is seen over the tomb, and the sides are decorated with the Apostles under round arched gallery. Other reliefs show the king, surrounded by their children, mourning the late queen, as well as Christ surrounded by a mandorla and the symbols of the four Evangelists. Other tombs are richly decorated with arabesques of Mudéjar-Romanesque style, as well as the Apostles.

Sacristy
From the ambulatory the sacristy of the church can be reached. The sacristy had been built in Manueline style in the early 16th century, but had to be rebuilt after the 1755 quake. The corridor leading to the sacristy, covered by a splendid Manueline rib vaulting, and the portal to the sacristy have survived the quake. The portal is a framed by intertwined vegetal branches that carry the coat-of-arms of Portugal.

Room of the Kings
This room, located close to the entrance of the church, has a series of 17th–18th century statues representing the kings of Portugal. The walls are decorated with blue-white 18th century tiles that tell the history of the Monastery of Alcobasa, since its foundation by Afonso Henriques.

Dormitory
The dormitory is a large Gothic room where the monks slept together; only the abbot was allowed to have his own room. In the 16th century the space was divided into individual cells. In the 1930s the cell walls were demolished.

Refectory
The refectory was the room in which the monks had their meals every day. While they ate, one of the monks read aloud passages of the Bible from a pulpit, which in Alcobasa is embedded on one of the walls. The access to the pulpit is done through an arched gallery with a staircase. The pulpit is one of the most harmonious architectural structures of the monastery. Like the dormitory, the refectory has many pillars separating aisles and is covered by early gothic rib vaulting.

Cloister of Silence
The cloister of the monastery was built during the reign of, and sponsored by, King Dinis I. It is one of the largest mediaeval Cistercian cloisters in Europe. Its columns are decorated by capitals with animal and vegetal motifs. The builder was the Portuguese architect Domingo Domingues. The Gothic Fountain Hall has an elegant early Renaissance water basin inside, decorated with Renaissance motifs including the coat-of-arms of the monastery. The second floor of the cloister, in Manueline style as revealed by its typical twisted columns, was built in the early 16th century.

Chapter House
This room, where the monks gathered to discuss the daily matters concerning the monastery, was the most important room after the church. Their daily gathering began by listening to the reading of a chapter from the Rule of St Benedict. The entrance to the house is through a Romanesque-style portal with two similar windows on each side. The room is now filled with Baroque statues created by the monks for the main chapel of the church.

Kitchen
The kitchen of the monastery was built and covered with tiles in the mid-18th century. The central chimney is enormous, supported by eight iron columns. Water and fresh fish were diverted from the river Alcoa to the kitchen basin through a specially built canal.

See also 
 Monastery of Batalha
 Monastery of Santa Cruz
 Alcobasa
 Azulejo

References

  Maria Augusta Pablo Trindade Ferreira. Mosteiro de Santa Maria de Alcobaça. ELO-IPPAR. 2nd edition, 1993.
  Mosteiro de Alcobaça, Instituto Português do Património Arquitectónico (Portuguese Institute for Architectural Heritage)
  Mosteiro de Alcobaça / Real Abadia de Santa Maria de Alcobaça (PDF), Direcção Geral dos Edifícios e Monumentos Nacionais (Portuguese General Bureau for National Buildings and Monuments)

External links

 Description of the Monastery of Alcobasa from UNESCO
The Monastery of Alcobaça on Google Arts & Culture
 Adrian Fletcher’s Paradoxplace Alcobaça Pages
 Site about Alcobaça (photos)
 Virtual tour of the Monastery of Alcobasa
 ALCOBASA Y BATALHA DOS MONASTERIOS DE PORTUGAL
 Catarina Fernandes Barreira Monasterios cistercienses en Portugal no siglo XV: problemas alrededor de los scriptoria e bibliotecas
 Monasterio de Alcobasa: un ejemplo destacado de arquitectura gótica

1153 establishments in Europe
12th-century establishments in Portugal
1834 disestablishments in Portugal
Religious organizations established in the 1150s
Christian monasteries established in the 12th century
Gothic architecture in Portugal
World Heritage Sites in Portugal
Alcobaca
Centro Region
Burial sites of the Castilian House of Burgundy
Roman Catholic monasteries in Portugal
UNESCO
Religious buildings and structures completed in 1252

es:Monasterio de Alcobasa#top